David Kaplan or Dave Kaplan may refer to:

Academics
 David B. Kaplan (born 1958), theoretical particle physicist, professor at the University of Washington
 David E. Kaplan (physicist), theoretical particle physicist, professor at the Johns Hopkins University
 David L. Kaplan (1923–2015), Canadian music professor and conductor
 Dovid Kaplan, senior lecturer at Ohr Somayach, Jerusalem, author and speaker
 David Kaplan (philosopher) (born 1933), American philosopher

Writers
 David A. Kaplan, American writer and journalist
 David E. Kaplan (author) (born 1955), American journalist and author

Others
 David Kaplan (filmmaker), American film director
 Dave Kaplan (fighter) (born 1979), American mixed martial artist
 Dave Kaplan (music executive), American music executive
 David Kaplan (pianist), American classical pianist
 David Kaplan (producer) (c. 1947–1992), ABC television news producer killed in Yugoslavia
 David Kaplan (radio) (born 1960), American radio host

See also
 David Caplan (1964–2019), Canadian politician